Calippo is a frozen dessert brand in the UK, Ireland, Portugal, Spain, Netherlands, Italy, Sweden, Germany, Australia and New Zealand.

Products
The most common flavours are orange, strawberry and tropical fruit. Calippo is made with 30% fruit juice and is 99% fat-free. Calippo is known to sell the following products:
Lemon 
Mango blueberry
Raspberry Pineapple
Tropical
Lemon Minis
Lime Minis
Cola
Bubblegum
Raspberry Pineapple minis
Multipack (x6) 
Strawberry
Orange
Lime
Magic Blue (To launch February 2023)
Lipton Ice Tea Green
Lipton Ice Tea Peach
Calippo Burst Frozen Drinks
Calippo Slush Frozen Drinks
Calippo Shots (discontinued 2020)

See also
 List of frozen dessert brands

References

Unilever brands
Brand name frozen desserts